Robert Dillon may refer to:

 Robert A. Dillon (1889–1944), American screenwriter and film director
 Robert Dillon (died 1579), Irish judge 
 Robert Dillon (died 1597), Irish lawyer, judge and politician
 Robert Dillon, 1st Baron Clonbrock (1754–1795), Irish politician
 Robert Dillon, 2nd Earl of Roscommon (died 1642), Irish peer
 Robert Dillon, 3rd Baron Clonbrock (1807–1893), Irish peer
 Robert Sherwood Dillon (born 1929), United States Ambassador to Lebanon